The U.S. House Energy Subcommittee on Oversight and Investigations is a subcommittee within the House Committee on Energy and Commerce.

Jurisdiction
Responsibility for oversight of agencies, departments, and programs within the jurisdiction of the full committee, and for conducting investigations within such jurisdiction.

The House Energy and Commerce Committee has jurisdiction over domestic and international sport, has investigated reports of abuse in sports, and has led congressional efforts to enact new laws to at better protect athletes.  It has an interest in sexual assault, sexual misconduct, sexual mistreatment, sexual harassment, and other sexual offenses in the U.S. Olympic movement and organized sports.

Members, 118th Congress

Historical membership rosters

115th Congress

116th Congress

117th Congress

References

External links
Official Homepage

Energy Oversight and Investigations
Sex crimes
Sexual abuse
Sexual misconduct
Sexual violence